Vysoké nad Jizerou is a town in Semily District in the Liberec Region of the Czech Republic. It has about 1,300 inhabitants.

Administrative parts
Villages of Helkovice, Horní Tříč, Sklenařice and Stará Ves are administrative parts of Vysoké nad Jizerou.

Geography
It lies in a hilly landscape of the Giant Mountains Foothills.

History
Vysoké was founded in the 14th century. The first written mention os Vysoké is from 1352, and on 4 August 1354 it officially became a town under the Latin name Alta Ciuitas.

The town was conveniently located on the trade routes that gave it importance. The development of Vysoké was hampered by Thirty Years' War, famine in 1771–1772 and large fire in 1834, which destroyed almost all the wooden buildings.

Demographics

Sport
Vysoké nad Jizerou is known as a ski resort. There are two ski areas, Větrov and Šachty.

Sights
Vysoké nad Jizerou is home to the Krakonoš Museum.

Ruins of Nístějka Castle

Nístějka is a ruin of a castle in Vysoké nad Jizerou founded probably in the 14th century by the Waldstein family. In 1390, it passed together with the settlement Vysoké into the property of Vartemberk family and in 1422 into Jenštejn family. Around 1460, the castle was briefly held by Bohemian King George of Poděbrady and his goods were attached to Návarov. Since 1519, the castle has been declared desolate, probably after a previous fire.

The ruins consists of remnants of towers, walls and cellars on a narrow, long promontory over the Jizera river near Hradsko. The castle consisted of an elongated barracks protected by a moat and a cylindrical tower at its head, and a small inner castle where only a backyard with a tank and a rectangular palace was on the rocks.

The castle is declared a protected area for the occurrence of herb Hackelia deflexa. In 1954, 1958 and 1972, archaeological research of the castle was carried out.

Notable people
Karel Kramář (1867–1930), politician
Josef Bím (1901–1934), soldier and skier
Dalibor Motejlek (born 1942), ski jumper

References

External links

Cities and towns in the Czech Republic
Populated places in Semily District